The III Corps of the Ottoman Empire (Turkish: 3üncü Kolordu or Üçüncü Kolordu) was one of the corps of the Ottoman Army. It was formed in the early 20th century during Ottoman military reforms.

Formation

Order of Battle, 1911 
With further reorganizations of the Ottoman Army, to include the creation of corps level headquarters, by 1911 the III Corps was headquartered in Kırk Kilise. The Corps before the First Balkan War in 1911 was structured as such:

III Corps, Kırk Kilise
7th Infantry Division, Kırk Kilise (Miralay Hilmi)
19th Infantry Regiment, Yemen
20th Infantry Regiment, Kırk Kilise
21st Infantry Regiment, Tırnovacık
7th Rifle Battalion, Yemen
7th Field Artillery Regiment, Kırk Kilise
7th Division Band, Kırk Kilise
8th Infantry Division, Çorlu (Mirliva Celâl Pasha)
22nd Infantry Regiment, Çorlu
23rd Infantry Regiment, Saray
24th Infantry Regiment, Samakof
8th Rifle Battalion, Çorlu
8th Field Artillery Regiment, Çorlu
8th Division Band, Çorlu
9th Infantry Division, Babaeski (Miralay Kadri)
25th Infantry Regiment, Yemen
26th Infantry Regiment, Babaeski
27th Infantry Regiment, Lüleburgaz
9th Rifle Battalion, Yemen
9th Field Artillery Regiment, Lüleburgaz
9th Division Band, Babaeski
Units of III Corps
3rd Rifle Regiment, Kırk Kilise
3rd Cavalry Brigade, Kırk Kilise
7th Cavalry Regiment, Çorlu
8th Cavalry Regiment, Kırk Kilise
10th Cavalry Regiment, Marmara Ereğlisi
2nd Mountain Artillery Battalion, Marmara Ereğlisi
3rd Mountain Artillery Battalion, Marmara Ereğlisi
2nd Field Howitzer Battalion, Adrianople
3rd Engineer Battalion, Adrianople
2nd Transport Battalion, Kırk Kilise
Border companies x 2

Balkan Wars

Order of Battle, October 17, 1912 
On October 17, 1912, the corps was structured as follows:

III Corps (Thrace, under the command of the Eastern Army)
7th Division, 8th Division, 9th Division
Afyon Karahisar Redif Division

Order of Battle, October 29, 1912 
On October 29, 1912, the corps was structured as follows:

III Corps (Thrace, under the command of the Second Eastern Army)
7th Division, 8th Division, 9th Division
Konya Redif Division, Amasya Redif Division

Order of Battle, November 17, 1912 
On November 17, 1912, the corps was structured as follows:

III Corps (Thrace, under the command of the Chataldja Army)
7th Division, 8th Division, 9th Division
South Wing Detachment
III Provisional Reserve Corps
Selimiye Redif Division, Fatih Redif Division, Afyon Redif Division

Order of Battle, March 25, 1913 
On March 25, 1913, the corps was structured as follows:

III Provisional Reserve Corps (Thrace, under the command of the Chataldja Army)
3rd Division
Yozgat Redif Division
III Corps (Thrace, under the command of the Chataldja Army)
7th Division, 8th Division, 9th Division

Order of Battle, July 1913 
III Corps
7th Division, 8th Division, 9th Division

World War I

Order of Battle, August 1914, November 1914 
In August 1914, November 1914, the corps was structured as follows:

III Corps (Thrace)
7th Division, 8th Division, 9th Division

Order of Battle, April 1915 
In late April 1915, the corps was structured as follows:

III Corps (Gallipoli)
7th Division, 9th Division, 19th Division

Order of Battle, Late Summer 1915, January 1916 
In late Summer 1915, January 1916, the corps was structured as follows:

III Corps (Gallipoli)
7th Division, 8th Division, 9th Division, 19th Division

Order of Battle, August 1916 
In August 1916, the corps was structured as follows:

III Corps (Caucasus)
1st Division, 7th Division, 14th Division, 53rd Division

Order of Battle, August 1917 
In August 1917, the corps was structured as follows:

III Corps (Syria)
24th Division, 50th Division

Order of Battle, January 1918 
In January 1918, the corps was structured as follows:

III Corps (Palestine)
1st Division, 19th Division, 24th Division

Order of Battle, September 1918 
In September 1918, the corps was structured as follows:

III Corps (Palestine)
1st Division, 11th Division

The Ottoman III Corps has been described as consisting of 7th, 8th and 9th Infantry Divisions from the beginning of the war to late April 1915 when the 19th Infantry Division was added while it was serving at Gallipoli. In August 1916 while serving in the Caucasus it is said to have consisted of 1st, 7th, 14th and 53rd Infantry Divisions and by August 1917 it formed part of the 7th Army in Palestine and made up of the 224th and 50th Infantry Divisions. By January 1918 it consisted of 1st, 19th and 24th Infantry Divisions with the 3rd Cavalry Division added in June 1918.

After Mudros

Order of Battle, November 1918 
In November 1918, the corps was structured as follows:

III Corps (Syria)
11th Division, 24th Division

Order of Battle, January 1919 
In January 1919, the corps was structured as follows:

III Corps (Anatolia, Sivas, Commander: Miralay Selâhaddin Bey)
15th Division (Samsun)
9th Infantry Regiment, 13th Infantry Regiment, 15th Infantry Regiment
5th Caucasian Division (Trabzon)
13th Infantry Regiment, 45th Infantry Regiment, 56th Infantry Regiment

Sources

See also
Central Army (Turkey)

Corps of the Ottoman Empire
Military units and formations of the Ottoman Empire in the Balkan Wars
Military units and formations of the Ottoman Empire in World War I
1911 establishments in the Ottoman Empire
Military units and formations established in 1911
Adrianople vilayet